"Green Eyes" is a popular song, originally written in Spanish under the title "Aquellos Ojos Verdes" ("Those Green Eyes") by Adolfo Utrera and Nilo Menéndez in 1929. The English translation was made by Eddie Rivera and Eddie Woods in 1931.

Spanish version
The song, a bolero, was written in 1929 and recorded in Cuba the same year. It was the only major hit, both originally in Cuba and then again in the Latin community in New York for Cuban pianist Nilo Menéndez. The lyrics were supplied by Cuban tenor Adolfo Utrera.

English version

The English version of the song was written in 1931 but did not become a major hit till ten years later when recorded by the Jimmy Dorsey orchestra. The recording was made on March 19, 1941 with vocals by Helen O'Connell and Bob Eberly and released by Decca Records as catalog number 3698. The flip side was "Maria Elena." The record first reached the Billboard charts on May 9, 1941 and lasted 21 weeks on the chart, peaking at #1. Since "Maria Elena" was also a #1 hit, this was a major double-sided hit recording.

Other recordings
English lyrics (translation)
The Ravens had regional success with a 1955 revival.
The Shadows performed an instrumental version of this song on their 1967 album Jigsaw.
Spanish lyrics (original)
Gloria Jean sang "Aquellos Ojos Verdes" in the 1943 film When Johnny Comes Marching Home.
Ibrahim Ferrer sang it on the 1999 album Buena Vista Social Club Presents Ibrahim Ferrer.
Ben Affleck sang it in the 2006 film Hollywoodland, in pivotal scenes just prior to the fatal shooting of his character, George Reeves.

Parodies
Allan Sherman recorded a version of the song titled "Green Stamps", a parody of S&H Green Stamps. During the recording session (according to the liner notes on the album), Sherman had a talk with the college types who hadn't heard of "Green Eyes." He said it was, like the Bossa Nova, once a red-hot tune by Helen O'Connell. He asked, "Any of you remember red-hot Helen O'Connell?" (About half did.)

Recorded versions

101 Strings Orchestra
All-Star Orchestra
Ray Anthony Orchestra
Orquesta Aragón
Desi Arnaz
Stanley Black
Boston Pops Orchestra
Les Brown
Buena Vista Social Club
John Bunch
Frank Chacksfield and his orchestra
Nat King Cole
Ray Conniff
Bing Crosby
Xavier Cugat
Bola de Nieve
Lou Donaldson
The Dorsey Brothers
Jimmy Dorsey orchestra (1941)
Bob Eberly
Roy Eldridge
Les & Larry Elgart
Cass Elliot (on The Julie Andrews Hour, 1973) 
George Evans
Ibrahim Ferrer
Bob Florence Big Band
Connie Francis
Jane Froman
Earl Grant
Bennie Green
Gene Krupa
La Gusana Ciega
Abbe Lane
Steve Lawrence
Enoch Light
Enric Madriguera
Barry Manilow with Rosemary Clooney
Glenn Miller
Helen O'Connell
Anita O'Day
Lisa Ono
Norrie Paramor, with Patricia Clark (soprano)
Guadalupe Pineda
Pony Poindexter
Baden Powell
The Ravens
Edmundo Ros
Harry Roy
Charlie Shavers
Trio Los Panchos
Conway Twitty
Bebo Valdes and his orchestra
The Ventures

See also
List of number-one singles of 1941 (U.S.)

References

1929 songs
1941 singles
Number-one singles in the United States
Boleros